The Romanian Radio National Orchestra is the symphony radio orchestra, part of the Romanian Radio Orchestras and Choirs. Concerts are held during all season at the Mihail Jora Concert Studio, well known as Sala Radio (Radio Concert Hall), located in Bucharest (Romania), 60-64 General Berthelot Street.

Chief conductors 
Mihail Jora
Alfred Alessandrescu
Theodor Rogalski
Ionel Perlea
Constantin Silvestri
Iosif Conta
Emanuel Elenescu
Mendi Rodan
Paul Popescu
Horia Andreescu
 Tiberiu Soare

References

External links 
National Radio Orchestra of Romania official site

Romanian orchestras
Radio and television orchestras
Musical groups established in 1928